No Soucy ! is the first studio album of French singer Ophélie Winter released in 1996. It provided five singles, including three top ten hits in France: her signature song "Dieu m'a donné la foi" which reached number one, "Le Feu qui m'attise" (number seven), "Shame on U" (number nine), a duet with Coolio "Keep It On The Red Light" (number 19) and "Rien que pour lui" (number 39). The album itself was successful, reaching number six in France.

Track listing
 "Soon" (Garrett, Karlin, SoulShock) — 4:18
 "le Feu qui m'attise" (J.Harry) — 3:57
 "Jusqu'au bout" (Brown, Martinelli, Mitchell, Winter, Winter) — 4:42
 "Face to Face" (Mithra) — 4:01
 "Revolution for Love" (Cutfather, Garrett, Joe, Martinelli) — 4:18
 "Rien que pour lui" (J.Harry) — 4:50
 "When I Got the Mood" (Hardt, Nakache, Nakache) — 4:49
 "Keep It On the Red Light" (feat. Coolio) (R.Mitra / Coolio / Shorty / Bambi Cruz) — 4:19
 "Dieu m'a donné la foi" (B.Godsend / D.Godsend - N.Hardt - P.Jerry / Adaptation : M.Winter ) — 3:58
 "Everlasting Love" (B.Godsend /D.Godsend - G.Godsend - N.Hardt / Adpation : O.Winter) — 4:10
 "Shame on U" (Hardt, Nakache, Nakache) — 4:38
 "Let the River Flow" (Hardt, Nakache, Nakache) — 3:46
 "Face to Face" (Slam Jam remix) (Mitra) — 4:02
 "Dieu m'a donné la foi" (Dee Litherhaus bootleg) (Hardt, Nakache, Nakache, Perry) — 6:04
 "The Air That I Breathe" (remix) (Harry) — 4:23
 "Shame on U" (P4 Remix) (Hardt, Nakache, Nakache) — 4:35
 "1000 Lbs Keep It on the Red Light" (Collio, Cruz, Mitra, Shorty) — 6:48

Personnel
 Christophe Denis — guitar
 Siedah Garrett — vocals
 Gibson — adaptation
 Nick Martinelli — vocals
 Aisha McCray — vocals
 Don Phillips — vocals
 Daddy Waku — vocals
 Guy Waku — arranger, clavier
 Mickaël Winter — adaptation, vocals
 Ophélie Winter — adaptation, vocals
 Betty Wright — vocals
 Jeanette Wright — vocals

Charts and sales

Weekly charts

Year-end charts

Certifications

References

1996 albums
Ophélie Winter albums